Sauze d'Oulx-Jouvenceaux is a venue located in Sauze d'Oulx, Italy. During the 2006 Winter Olympics, it hosted the freestyle skiing competitions.

References
2006 Winter Olympics official report. Volume 3. pp. 81–2.

Venues of the 2006 Winter Olympics
Olympic freestyle skiing venues
Ski areas and resorts in Italy
Sports venues in Italy
Sauze d'Oulx